The Australian Institute of Interpreters and Translators (AUSIT) is the professional association for translators and interpreters in Australia.
 
AUSIT has a membership over 750 interpreters and translators across Australia.

AUSIT is affiliated with the International Federation of Translators (FIT).

History
AUSIT was founded in 1987, when it brought together existing local associations and specialist groups in Australia. Today AUSIT has branches in every state and territory of the country.

See also 
 National Accreditation Authority for Translators and Interpreters (NAATI)

External links
Official site

Professional associations based in Australia